This is a list of Registered Historic Places in Narragansett, Rhode Island.

|}

See also

National Register of Historic Places listings in Washington County, Rhode Island
List of National Historic Landmarks in Rhode Island

References

N
.
.Narragansett
Narragansett
Narragansett, Rhode Island